Alexandra Oliver (born 1970) is a Canadian poet, who won the Pat Lowther Award in 2014 for her collection Meeting the Tormentors in Safeway.

A graduate of the University of Toronto and the Stonecoast MFA Program in Creative Writing, Oliver began as a Vancouver-based slam poet in the early 1990s, and appeared in the 1998 documentary film SlamNation.

Bibliography

Meeting the Tormentors in Safeway (2013)
Measure for Measure: An Anthology of Poetic Meters, co-editor with Annie Finch (2015)
Let the Empire Down (2016)
On the Oven Sits a Maiden (chapbook) (2018)
Hail the Invisible Watchman (2022)

References

External links

20th-century Canadian poets
21st-century Canadian poets
Canadian women poets
Canadian spoken word poets
University of Toronto alumni
Writers from Vancouver
Living people
Slam poets
21st-century Canadian women writers
20th-century Canadian women writers
1970 births